Kelle Cruz is an astrophysicist who specializes in studying brown dwarfs. She currently works as an associate professor at Hunter College in New York City. With her study of brown dwarfs, Cruz hopes to better understand planets outside the Solar System and map out the universe, saying, "I hope that what I’m doing in our little bit of the galaxy is similar to what the explorers did by discovering and mapping the New World and North America."

Further reading

Publications
 2MASS 22344161+4041387AB: A Wide, Young, Accreting, Low-mass Binary in the LkHa233 Group 
 Measuring Tiny Mass Accretion Rates Onto Young Brown Dwarfs. 
 Young L. Dwarfs Identified in the Field: A Preliminary Low-Gravity, Optical Spectral Sequence from L0 to L5. 
 A Sample of Very Young Field L Dwarfs and Implications for the Brown Dwarf "Lithium Test" at Early Ages 
 The Brown Dwarf Kinematics Project (BDKP)I. Proper Motions and Tangential Velocities for a Large Sample of Late-type M, L, and T Dwarfs

Awards and honors
 Spitzer Fellowship, 2007 
 NSF Astronomy and Astrophysics Postdoctoral Fellowship, 2004 
 NSF Graduate Research Fellowship, 2001 
 NSF Graduate Research Fellowship (Honorable Mention), 2000 
 APS Corporate Minority Scholar, 1998 & 1999

See also
 List of astronomers (includes astrophysicists)

References

Year of birth missing (living people)
Living people
American astrophysicists
Women astronomers
Women astrophysicists